Pincer may refer to:

Pincers (tool)
Pincer (biology), part of an animal
Pincer ligand, a terdentate, often planar molecule that tightly binds a variety of metal ions
The Pincer move in the game of Go

See also
Pincer movement, military manoeuvre